Yonrico Scott (October 6, 1955 – September 19, 2019) was an American drummer and percussionist. He was a longtime member of the Grammy winning The Derek Trucks Band, became a bandleader of his own ensemble, the Yonrico Scott Band, and later worked with the Royal Southern Brotherhood, with Cyril Neville. Having developed his craft not only from years of session work, roadwork, and study, the Cape Cod Times proclaimed him "a standout in the band... whose strong beats powered songs such as 'I'll Find My Way' off the group's Songlines CD".

Musical career

Early years
Yonrico Scott was raised in Detroit, Michigan with a keen interest in music, encouraged by his family. He first showed interest in playing the drums, receiving lessons at age seven. For a period of time, while learning and practicing the drums, Scott moved on to playing gospel music, and at age fourteen had mastered all that was available in the metropolitan city the previous year, earning him a reputation as the best performer in that genre. Scott moved on and became a student Motown drummer George Hamilton, with a growing interest in R&B music in his teens. He later worked as a session musician for a large number of famous figures, including Stevie Wonder.

After high school graduation, Scott attended the University of Kentucky, where he graduated in 1978 with a Bachelor's Degree, in performance percussion. After college, Scott moved to Atlanta, Georgia. While in Atlanta, he recorded and performed with Atlanta jazz artists Joe Jennings and Howard Nicholson and their band Life Force, including on the 1981 album Fearless Warriors.

Career

Scott joined The Derek Trucks Band in 1995. Scott was the second permanent member (after bassist Todd Smallie) of the blues rock band, which toured extensively. During the band's formative years, Trucks added two other musicians, but was unsatisfied with their contributions, but Scott remained, through a metamorphosis of both personnel and musical direction while Trucks was assembling the band's final lineup, which was complete in 2002 with the addition of Mike Mattison as vocalist, Kofi Burbridge (keyboards, flute and backing vocals), and occasional appearances by percussionist Count M'Butu, as well as Trucks himself. By 2010, Scott had contributed to the songwriting and performed on every one of the band's six studio albums and both of their live albums. In 2010, accepted the Grammy Award for Best Contemporary Blues Album for both himself and for all the other members of The Derek Trucks Band at the 52nd Grammy Awards, for their 2009 album, Already Free.

At the close of 2009, Derek Trucks dissolved the band for at least a year. Trucks' wife, Susan Tedeschi dismissed her sidemen, and joined Derek in a new project, The Tedeschi Trucks Band. Scott recorded on Tedeschi's album, Wait for Me, in 2002. He performed with Earl Klugh, and played many gigs with The Yonrico Scott Band throughout 2010.

Scott was also the studio and touring drummer for the Royal Southern Brotherhood, which toured across 27 countries in 2012–13 (according to bassist Charlie Wooton) and released their first album in late 2012, on which Scott is credited with some songwriting. He and Charlie Wooten became the backbone of a "supergroup" with Devon Allman, Cyril Neville and Mike Zito that was lauded all over the globe.

In 2015, Scott guest drummed on Jeremiah Johnson's album, Grind.

Artwork
Yonrico Scott is credited on the album Songlines for the set list illustration. The album gained its name from an Aboriginal concept that the world had been sung into existence by "totemic" elder beings who wandered the Australian continent along invisible pathways, breathing and singing the names of everything in creation. Those "songlines" became important as everything had been brought to life, and order in such a fashion. Scott's ability to represent this concept arrived both on the album cover and backdrop of the stage at the venues during The Derek Trucks Band's tour to support the album.

Equipment
Scott used Pearl Drums, Zildjian sticks and cymbals, Lp Percussions, Everyones Drumming.

Later works and death
Scott recorded his second solo album at Sit-N-Spin Recording Studios in Greenville, South Carolina.  He died on September 19, 2019, at age 63.

Discography

Solo
 Be In My World (2012)
 Quest of the Big Drum (2014)
 Only A Smile (2015)
 Life of a Dreamer (2016)

With The Derek Trucks Band
 The Derek Trucks Band (1997)
 Out of the Madness (1998)
 Joyful Noise (2002)
 Soul Serenade (2003)
 Live at Georgia Theatre (2004)
 Songlines (2006)
 Songlines Live (2006, DVD)
 Already Free (2009)
 Roadsongs (2010)

With Royal Southern Brotherhood
 Royal Southern Brotherhood (2012)
 Heartsoulblood (2014)

Other contributions
 Power (1986) (Kansas)
 A Woman's Intuition (1987) (Dardanelle)
 Half Past the Blues (1997) (Vernon Garrett)
 Live... With a Little Help from Our Friends (1998) (Gov't Mule)
 Wait for Me (2002) (Susan Tedeschi)
 Character Farm and Other Short Stories (2011) (Jonathan Scales)
 Some 1 I Used To Be (2014) (Sam Wheelock)
 Grind (2015) (Jeremiah Johnson)
 Strategy: Our Tribute to Philadelphia (2016) (The Three Degrees)
 Bad Penny (2018) (Vanja Sky)

References

External links
Record label website
 The Derek Trucks Band official website
Yonrico Scott website
 2010 Benefit -Yonrico Scott
2006 Article
Yonrico Scott Email Newsletter Archive
Yonrico Scott discography

1955 births
2019 deaths
African-American drummers
American rock drummers
Blues rock musicians
Columbia Records artists
Contemporary blues musicians
Grammy Award winners
Musicians from Detroit
The Derek Trucks Band members
University of Kentucky alumni
20th-century African-American people
21st-century African-American people